Mazocraeidae is a flatworm family in the order Mazocraeidea.

Genera
according to PESI
 Grubea Diesing, 1858
 Kuhnia Sproston, 1945
 Mazocraeoides Price, 1936
 Mazocraes Hermann, 1782
 Ophicotyle Beneden & Hesse, 1863
 Pseudanthocotyloides Price, 1959
 Pseudoanthocotyle Bychowsky & Nagibina, 1954
 Pseudokuhnia Rohde & Watson, 1985

According to the World Register of Marine Species
 Clupeocotyle Hargis, 1955
 Cribromazocraes Mamaev, 1981
 Grubea Diesing, 1858
 Heteromazocraes Mamaev, 1981
 Kuhnia Sproston, 1945
 Leptomazocraes Mamaev, 1975
 Mazocraeoides Price, 1936
 Mazocraes Hermann, 1782
 Neogrubea
 Neomazocraes Price, 1934
 Ophicotyle Beneden & Hesse, 1863
 Paramazocraes Tripathi, 1959
 Pseudanthocotyle Bychowsky & Nagibina, 1954
 Pseudanthocotyloides Price, 1959
 Pseudokuhnia Rohde & Watson, 1985
 Pseudomazocraes Price, 1961
 Reimericotyle Mamaev, 1984
 Taurimazocraes Mamaev, 1982
 Pseudoanthocotyloides Price, 1959 accepted as Pseudanthocotyloides Price, 1959

References

External links

Polyopisthocotylea
Platyhelminthes families